John Causby (27 October 1942 – 8 June 2019) was an Australian cricketer. He played 63 first-class matches for South Australia between 1960 and 1974, and played in its Sheffield Shield victories in 1968/69 and 1970/71. He also played in 2 premierships for Woodville District Cricket Club in 1965/66 & 1977/78.

See also
 List of South Australian representative cricketers

References

External links
 

1942 births
2019 deaths
Australian cricketers
South Australia cricketers
Cricketers from Adelaide